The 1951 Memorial Cup final was the 33rd junior ice hockey championship of the Canadian Amateur Hockey Association. The George Richardson Memorial Trophy champions Barrie Flyers of the Ontario Hockey Association in Eastern Canada competed against the Abbott Cup champions Winnipeg Monarchs of the Manitoba Junior Hockey League in Western Canada. In a best-of-seven series, held at Maple Leaf Gardens in Toronto, Barrie Arena in Barrie, Ontario and the Colisée de Québec in Quebec City, Barrie won their 1st Memorial Cup, defeating Winnipeg 4 games to 0.

Scores
Game 1: Barrie 5-1 Winnipeg (in Winnipeg)
Game 2: Barrie 5-1 Winnipeg (in Winnipeg)
Game 3: Barrie 4-3 Winnipeg (in Brandon)
Game 4: Barrie 9-5 Winnipeg (in Winnipeg)

Winning roster

Lionel Barber, Marvin Brewer, Real Chevrefils, Don Emms, Paul Emms, Bill Hagan, Lorne Howes, Leo Labine, Jack McKnight, Doug Mohns, Jim Morrison, Daniel O'Connor, Lloyd Pearsall, George Stanutz, Jerry Toppazzini, Doug Towers, Ralph Willis, Chuck Woods, Jack White.  Coach: Hap Emms

References

External links
 Memorial Cup 
 Canadian Hockey League

1950–51 in Canadian ice hockey
Memorial Cup tournaments
Ice hockey competitions in Brandon, Manitoba
Ice hockey competitions in Winnipeg
1951 in Manitoba